Abdelaziz Ben Tifour (– ) was a professional French-Algerian footballer who played as a midfielder.

Life and career
He was a pioneer of Algerian football playing in Tunisia and France in the 40s and 50s as well as establishing the first Algerian national team with two other FLN activists featuring ten players in France's provisional World Cup squad on the eve of the finals in Sweden. One of those players was Ben Tifour himself, who had played for the French national team on four occasions including one appearance at the 1954 World Cup.

Born in Hussein-Dey. In the summer of 1948, he moved to Europe to play for French first division club OGC Nice, making his debut in a 1–1 draw with Red Star Paris and by the time Ben Tifour played at the 1954 FIFA World Cup in Switzerland in a 3–2 win over Mexico; he had already won two league titles and a French Cup with OGC Nice. He moved to AS Troyes-Savinienne after six seasons with Nice in 1954 and then signed for AS Monaco in 1956, which would be his last club in Europe. In total, he made 280 appearances in the French top division, scoring 62 goals. He returned to Tunis in 1958 to form the FLN Algerian national team.

When Algeria was granted independence in 1962, the 33-year-old Ben Tifour unlike Mekloufi and Ahmed Oudjani who moved back to play in Europe, returned to his homeland to take up a player-coach role at USM Alger leading them to the first Algerian championship in 1963.

Ben Tifour died at the age of 43 while he was coach at JS Kabylie during the 1970–1971 season.

Clubs
Espérance Sportive de Tunis (1945–1946)
Club Sportif de Hammam Lif (1946–1948)
OGC Nice (1948–1954)
AS Troyes-Savinienne (1954–1956)
AS Monaco (1956–1958)
FLN Equipe (1958–1962)
USMA, Union Sportive de la Medina d'Alger (1962–1963)

References

External links
 
 

1927 births
1970 deaths
Algerian emigrants to France
French footballers
Algerian footballers
Algeria international footballers
France international footballers
Dual internationalists (football)
French people of Kabyle descent
1954 FIFA World Cup players
OGC Nice players
AS Troyes-Savinienne players
AS Monaco FC players
Ligue 1 players
Footballers from Algiers
Kabyle people
USM Alger players
Algerian football managers
Algeria national football team managers
Espérance Sportive de Tunis players
Expatriate football managers in Tunisia
JS Kabylie managers
USM Alger managers
FLN football team players
Association football midfielders